There are three islands and six other geographical places called Fairway Rock.

Fairway Rock